Malcolm Alan Sircom (3 August 1934 – 11 June 2008) was an English writer, musician, musical director and composer.

Biography
Born in 1934, Sircom was raised next to Highbury, the old home of Arsenal Football Club, of which he was an eager supporter. He was also a keen cricket player.

He attended Cambridge University. After graduation, he began working in theatre and particularly old time music hall where he met his first wife, actress Patsy Rowlands. The couple were divorced in 1967. In 1973, he married his second wife, actress Judith Boyd.

He began writing school musicals in the 1990s and it is for this that he is perhaps best known. His shows are published by "Musicline School Musicals."

Death
Sircom died in 2008 in Derby, following a long illness. He was survived by his second wife, Judith, and his children Alan (from his first marriage) and Jamie and Kate (from his second marriage).

Works
 Ernest, 1959
 Pineapple, 1959
 Pardon my Language, 1963, staged by Alan Vaughan Williams at the Theatre Royal Lincoln.
 The Mr. Men Musical, 1985
 Ebenezer, 1992
 Olivia
 Dream On!
 The Rocky Monster Show
 The Dracula Rock Show
 The Pinafore Pirates
 Gel

References

External links
 "Musicline School Musicals", publisher of Malcolm Sircom's works
 The Evening Telegraph obituary

1934 births
2008 deaths
English writers
English male composers
English musical theatre composers
Music hall performers
People from Highbury
Alumni of the University of Cambridge
20th-century British male musicians